Gary Oliver (born 19 November 1966) is an English actor of the stage, television, and film. He known for his roles in guest starring roles in Game of Thrones, New Tricks and Atlantis.

Career
Oliver is principally active as a stage actor. In 1990 he performed in Carlos Muñiz's The Inkwell at the Battersea Arts Centre. In 1991 he appeared in Shakespeare's Romeo and Juliet at The New Hereford Theatre. In 1994 he performed in Max Frisch's The Fire Raisers with Arts Threshold, Gloucester Terrace. In 1995 he starred in Brad Fraser's Unidentified Human Remains and the True Nature of Love at the Royal Exchange, Manchester.

Oliver has performed with the Royal Shakespeare Company (RSC). In 1997 he toured with the RSC to perform the role of Balthazar in Shakespeare's The Comedy of Errors at the San Francisco Shakespeare Festival under the direction of Tim Supple. In 1998 he starred in the premiere of Andrew Payne's two man one act play then what? at The Old Red Lion, Islington. In 1999 he starred as Louis Ironson in Tony Kushner's Angels in America at the Manchester Central Library Theatre with Peter Polycarpou as Roy Cohn and Richard Cant as Prior.  That same year he starred as Gary in Lynne Harvey's Something for Grownups at the Drayton Court Theatre. In 2000 he performed in the Royal National Theatre's production of Anton Chekhov's The Cherry Orchard.

After appearing in the final scene of the HBO series Game of Thrones in season 4, Oliver reprised his role as Ternesio Terys in season 5.

Filmography

References

External links

Living people
21st-century English male actors
Actors from Northamptonshire
English male television actors
1966 births